The 1973 Harvard Crimson football team represented Harvard University in the 1973 NCAA Division I football season. They were led by third-year head coach Joseph Restic and played in the Ivy League.

Schedule

References

Harvard
Harvard Crimson football seasons
Harvard Crimson football
Harvard Crimson football